Paul Noël Lasseran  (1868 – 17 February 1933) was a French painter, decorator and poet from Lectoure. He is best known for his murals and decor in various churches throughout Gers. These include Chapelle des Carmélites, Lectoure (1889), Église paroissiale Saint-Jean-Baptiste de Goutz  (1901–1903), Église Sainte-Blandine, Castet-Arrouy (1901) and Église Saint-Christophe, Masseube (Gers) 1932–1933.

Bibliography
 Deux siècles d'Histoire de Lectoure (1780-1980), Syndicat d'initiative, Lectoure, 1981.
 Paul Lasseran, artiste peintre surtout : La Taverne pendant la guerre, Albi, Imprimerie des Orphelins Apprentis, 1915

1868 births
1933 deaths
French decorative artists
19th-century French painters
French male painters
20th-century French painters
20th-century French male artists
19th-century French male artists